Lal wa Sarjangal (La'l wa Sarjangal), is a district in the north-east of Ghor province in central Afghanistan. The district center is the town of La'l.

Demographics 
The population of Ashtarlay is made up of ethnic Hazara people.

Early history
Traditionally, in the feudal Hazara society prior to the 1888–1893 massacre of the Hazaras, Lal wa Sarjangal was part of the Greater Daizangi region ruled in parts by feudal chiefs known as Mirs and Begs. The country's grazing land had historically proven to be useful for maintaining large armies by the Mirs and Begs. Prominent Hazara Mirs and Begs of the old days include Nauroz Beg and Yusuf Beg who hold considerable respect in the local folklore.

20th century
During the period that followed the genocide by Abdul Rahman and the failure of state following assassination of Nadir Khan, the hazara elite came to an uneasy settlement with the Kabul government. District governors almost always Pashtun were appointed by the central government who governed the area with the help of government-appointed arbabs like in most parts of the country. Over this period, the district oversaw the rise of many feudal chiefs turned politicians. This period was a harsh time for the hazaras, but the people of Lal with hard work and dedication survived through this phase and by the 1970s, the district had a reputation in the hazara community for large number of intellectuals, university graduates and prominent personalities.

Towering figures of this period included Member of Parliament Khadim Hussain Baig, Haji Sarwar and Haji Sayed Akbar. Similarly, local politicians of prominence well-respected by the people included names such as Kalbi Reza Baig, Sayed Nasir La'li, Mir Mohammad Amir Baig, Arbab Nadir Shah and other local leaders. The La'l elite proved to be well-respected because of their piety and understanding of the people's needs.

Communism and Lali educated elite
Lal Sar Jangal was a vibrantly changing and progressive society right before the revolution that struck in 1978. The district's educated elite however were generally massacred by the communist regime of Nur Muhammad Taraki and Hafeezullah Amin, mostly under the allegation of being Maoists. Prominent student leaders from the district included Aziz Tughian and Mohammad Ranjbar.

On the other hand, the PDPA members from Lal Sar Jangal were also prominent and overwhelmingly successful. The first district governor of the Lal Sar Jangal from the local Hazara population was Ewaz Ali who was later on brutally murdered by members of the Mujahideen faction. The period of the PDPA rise also trained a number of talent Lal youth that later on took important positions in the Afghan government. Names such as General Murad Ali Murad commander of Afghanistan's ground forces and Mohammad Hussain Gharjistani the chief of staff of Vice Presidential office are part of a large number of officers and cadre coming from the province.

Mujahideen and the establishment of Hizb-e-wahdat
Lal Sar Jangal from 1979 to 2001 was controlled by the new rising Jihadi organisations mostly linked with Iran. These organisations have mixed reputation for engaging the people in local civil wars and imposing different sorts of illegal taxes. However, the shining point of the Jihadi organisations for Lal Sar Jangal was the establishment and unification of these local parties in 1988 under the banner of Hezb-e-wahdat. This party was formed by the hard-fought struggle of a respectable Mujahid leader Sayed Abdul Hameed Sajjadi. The first convention of unity was signed by all leaders of the hazara resistance in Lal including Mohammad Mohaqqiq who represented the Northern Hazaras led by late Abdul Ali Mazari.

Post 2001
Lal never fell to the Taliban. It continued to be a hub of resistance throughout the national resistance against the Taliban. Unlike most other districts, the people of Lal continued to harbour anti-Taliban resistance. With the fall of Taliban, the old rivalries of the two Hezb-e-Wahdat factions i.e. Akbari and Khalili continued to haunt the district. Even until today, the politics of the district is controlled by these Jihadi parties. A new elite of youth is on rise with prominent presence in universities both inside and outside Afghanistan. High schools are packed with students and women have an active role in the reconstruction of the district.

In common with other mountainous districts, Lal Wa Sarjangal suffers from low rainfall and severe and long winters, both of which affect agriculture, the most important source of income. Very less attention is paid in the education system at the district therefore most basic elements are not provided for the students such as proper school buildings, furniture schools books etc...

Prominent personalities
 General Murad Ali Murad, commander of Afghan National Army Infantry
 Hassan Abdullahi Minister of Urban Development
 Qorban Kohestani, Member of Parliament
 Nadir Shah Bahr, Member of Parliament
 Ruqia Nayel, Member of Parliament
 Haidar  Ali Etimadi, Leader of the Hezb-e-Wahdat faction
 Jafar Mahdavi, Member of Parliament and leader of Mellat Party of Afghanistan
 Asad Buda, Anthropologist and Writer
 Zahra Hossainzada, poet
 Ali Aalimi Kermani, university professor, Writer and Translator

Health 
There are 11 health centers in Lal wa Sar e Jangal district. it's consist of Lal district health center, Safid-Ab, Daimirdad, Khame-e-Shur, Qala-e-Pechi, Kerman, Talkhak and Garmab basic health centers, Ghighanace health sub-center, Afghan red crescent society health center in Talkhak valley and LEPCO special health clinic for the  treat of Tubercles and Leprosy patients. All of the health centers are funded by the MoPH through implementing Afghan NGOs which significantly provides poor health services, except ARCS and LAPCO clinics that's funded by national and international organizations. Luck of qualified medical doctors, specialists, obstetricians and medical technicians are a big challenge for provision of health services to the community.  Bad quality of road, isolation of district from capital city and center of the province, unqualified medical staff, lack of proper training for the existing staff and lack of interests of medical staff to come for work from outside Lal wa Sar e Jangal adds to challenges and health problems.  The mothers and children mortality rate is high in this province due to lack of proper maternal health, post-natal and ante-natal care, bad roads creates problem to get easy access to the health facilities and also low level of knowledge of the existing health staff. Acute respiratory infections and other respiratory diseases are common in the winter time and Acute Castro Enteritis is common in the summer time due to lack of access to the clean drinking water. Some, other sickness such as urinary tract infections, malnutrition in children and women and Joint pain are also common in this district during all seasons.

See also 
 Districts of Afghanistan
 Hazarajat

References

External links

 UNHCR District profile
 Map of Settlements AIMS, August 2002
 

Districts of Ghor Province
Hazarajat